The Philippine Basketball Association Hall of Fame is an institution that honors selected former players and personalities of the Philippine Basketball Association. It was launched on May 29, 2005, during the Reunion Game pitting two teams consisting of the 25 Greatest Players in PBA History. In 2005, it inducted its first 12 members to the group.

Inductees

Ceremony dates and locations

References

External links
  PBA.ph:  CRISPA, TOYOTA STALWARTS LEAD INITIAL HALL OF FAME INDUCTEES

Hall of Fame
Basketball museums and halls of fame
Halls of fame in the Philippines